Peregrine Hyde Osborne, 3rd Duke of Leeds (11 November 1691 – 9 May 1731) was a British peer.

Early life
He was the second son of Peregrine, Earl of Danby and his wife, the former Bridget Hyde, only daughter of Sir Thomas Hyde, 2nd Baronet.

In 1694, when his grandfather, the 1st Marquess of Carmarthen, was created Duke of Leeds, and his father assumed the title Marquess of Carmarthen, he became Lord Peregrine Osborne.

Career
In 1709, he began his Grand Tour together with his older brother William, Earl of Danby, who died of smallpox in Utrecht in 1711, at which point Osborne assumed the title Earl of Danby. In 1712, when his father succeeded as 2nd Duke of Leeds, he became Marquess of Carmarthen. Lord Carmarthen was summoned to the House of Lords in his father's most junior title as 3rd Baron Osborne by a writ in acceleration in January 1713 and succeeded to his father's other titles in 1729.

From 1712 to 1713, he served as Lord Lieutenant of the East Riding of Yorkshire.

Personal life
On 16 December 1712, he married firstly Lady Elizabeth Harley, youngest daughter of the 1st Earl of Oxford and Earl Mortimer. She died in the childbed only a year later. 
 Thomas Osborne, 4th Duke of Leeds (1713–1789), who married Lady Mary Godolphin, second daughter of Francis Godolphin, 2nd Earl of Godolphin and his wife Henrietta Godolphin (née Churchill), 2nd Duchess of Marlborough, in 1740.

On 17 September 1719, he married secondly to Lady Anne Seymour, third daughter of Charles Seymour, 6th Duke of Somerset by his first wife, Lady Elizabeth Thynne, styled Baroness Percy (only child of Josceline Percy, 11th Earl of Northumberland). A son, who originated from this marriage, died young.

After her death in 1722, he married finally, on 9 April 1725 at St Anne's Church, Soho, Juliana Hele, a daughter and co-heiress of Roger Hele of Holwell in the parish of Newton Ferrers, Devon.

Lord Leeds died, aged 40, and was buried in the Osborne family chapel at All Hallows Church, Harthill, South Yorkshire. He was succeeded in his titles by his only surviving child, Thomas, Marquess of Carmarthen, born by his first wife.

References

1691 births
1731 deaths
Peregrine
103
Burials at Osborne family chapel, All Hallows' Church (Harthill)